White lady (also known as a Delilah, or Chelsea Side-car) is a classic cocktail that is made with gin, cointreau or Triple Sec, fresh lemon juice and an optional egg white. It belongs to the sidecar family, made with gin in place of brandy. The cocktail sometimes also includes additional ingredients, for example egg white, sugar, cream, or creme de menthe.

The classic concoction is most commonly served in a Martini cocktail glass. When an egg white is added a champagne coupe is preferable; the silky foam clings more pleasingly to the curved glass.

Origin
The white lady was made in honor of Eveline Alice Wander Gorkiewicz, who helped British prisoners of war escape Turkey in the first world war. She would dress up as an old Turkish wash lady (dressed in white) and hide the prisoners in the washing trolley. The drink was named by the soldiers she rescued. The original recipe for the white lady was devised by Harry MacElhone in 1919 at Ciro's Club in London. He originally used crème de menthe, but replaced it with gin at Harry's New York Bar in Paris in 1929.

According to the American Bar at the Savoy Hotel, the drink was created there by Harry Craddock.

History
A recipe for the white lady made with gin, Cointreau, and fresh lemon juice appears in the Savoy Cocktail Book, published in 1930. Joe Gilmore, former Head Barman at The Savoy, says this was one of Laurel and Hardy's favorite drinks. 

Early recipes like MacElhone's and Craddock's do not have egg white as one of the recorded ingredients.

Comparison with gin sour
While sours are characterized by a bright acidity, sidecars are often drier, since they are made with liqueurs (in this case Cointreau) instead of sugar. Sidecars are considered more of a challenge for bartenders because the proportion of ingredients is more difficult to balance for liqueurs of variable sweetness.

In popular culture
In John le Carré's 1965 novel The Looking Glass War, the British spy, and main protagonist, Fred Leiser's favorite drink is a white lady and he makes several attempts to get other agents to try the cocktail.

In Dorothy Sayers' mystery novel Have His Carcase, Lord Peter has a white lady when he hears about his "Lady" Miss Harriet Vane being in trouble again.

It is mentioned in the novel Islands in the Stream by Ernest Hemingway.

It is also mentioned in the film, "Inspector Hornleigh" (1938).

A mock version of the drink is made in the Japanese manga series Kaguya-sama: Love Is War.

References

Cocktails with gin
Cocktails with triple sec or curaçao
Sour cocktails